The Tender Gender is an album by guitarist Kenny Burrell recorded in 1966 and released on the Cadet label.

Reception

Allmusic awarded the album 3 stars.

Track listing 
All compositions by Kenny Burrell except as indicated
 "Mother-In-Law" - 4:38   
 "Hot Bossa" - 4:33   
 "People" (Bob Merrill, Jule Styne) - 2:41   
 "Isabella" - 4:55   
 "Girl Talk" (Neal Hefti, Bobby Troup) - 3:05   
 "Suzy" - 4:43   
 "The Tender Gender" - 4:49   
 "La Petite Mambo"  (Erroll Garner) - 3:29   
 "If Someone Had Told Me" (Peter DeRose, Charles Tobias) - 3:09   
 "I'm Confessin' (That I Love You)" (Doc Daugherty, Al J. Neiburg, Ellis Reynolds) - 3:45

Personnel 
Kenny Burrell - guitar
Richard Wyands - piano 
Martin Rivera - bass 
Oliver Jackson - drums

References 

Kenny Burrell albums
1966 albums
Albums produced by Esmond Edwards
Cadet Records albums